Elizabeth Ashley is a British physician who is Director of the Laos-Oxford-Mahosot Hospital-Wellcome Trust Research Unit (LOMWRU) in Laos. She specialises in infectious diseases and medical microbiology and virology. She is an associate editor for the Malaria Journal and serves on the Council of the International Society for Infectious Diseases.

Early life and education 
Ashley grew up in Croydon. She attended a comprehensive concert school, where she specialised in mathematics, French and science. She became interested in medicine as a teenager, and trained as a physician in London. She completed an intercalated degree in sociology. In 2000, Ashley moved to Mae Sot, where she started working in the Mahosot Hospital. Later that year, she moved to the Shoklo Malaria Research Unit to provide healthcare for people living around the Thai-Myanmar border. She worked under the supervision of Nick White and Francois Nosten. She realised that malaria research was her vocation in 2006. Based on her experiences in these places, Ashley completed a doctorate on chemotherapeutic studies. She worked as a clinician in Paris and London. In Paris she worked for Médecins Sans Frontières.

Research and career 
Ashley was appointed head of the Tracking Resistance to Artemisinin Collaboration (TRAC) in 2011. Under her leadership, the organisation mapped the extent of artemisinin resistance in Plasmodium falciparum. The trial included 15 sites in 10 counties of Asia and Africa.

In 2016, Ashley was appointed the Director of Clinical Research at the Myanmar Oxford Clinical Research Unit (MOCRU). She was appointed Director of the Laos-Oxford-Mahosot Hospital-Wellcome Trust Research Unit (LOMWRU) in Laos in 2019. The research collaboration involves almost 100 scientists, and studies infectious diseases in Vientiane. She has overseen the development of antimcirobial prescribing guidelines in Lao. Ashley was appointed Professor of Tropical Medicine in 2020.

Selected publications

References 

Medical journal editors
English women medical doctors
Tropical medicine
Year of birth missing (living people)
Living people